The 2015–16 Egypt Cup was the 84th edition of the oldest recognised football tournament in Africa. It was sponsored by Obour Land, and known as the Obour Land Cup for sponsorship purposes. The winner qualifies for the 2017 CAF Confederation Cup.

Egyptian Premier League side Zamalek were the defending champions and successfully defended their title after they defeated  3–1 in the final.

Schedule and format

Bracket
The following is the bracket which the Egypt Cup resembled. Numbers in parentheses next to the match score represent the results of a penalty shoot-out.

Round of 32
The draw was held on 28 February 2016 at 14:00 (UTC+2) at the EFA headquarters in Gezira, Cairo.

If a match ended as a draw in this round, the two teams go straight to penalty shootout.

Matches took place from 19–31 March 2016.

Round of 16
The draw was held on 28 February 2016 at 14:00 (UTC+2) at the EFA headquarters in Gezira, Cairo.

If a match ended as a draw in this round, the two teams goes to Extra time. If the score remains even after the Extra time the two team goes to penalty shootout.

Matches took place from 10 April–12 July 2016.

Quarter-finals
The draw was held on 28 February 2016 at 14:00 (UTC+2) at the EFA headquarters in Gezira, Cairo.

If a match ended as a draw in this round, the two teams goes to Extra time. If the score remains even after the Extra time the two team goes to penalty shootout.

Matches took place from 15 May–1 August 2016.

Semi-finals
The draw was held on 28 February 2016 at 14:00 (UTC+2) at the EFA headquarters in Gezira, Cairo.

If a match ended as a draw in this round, the two teams goes to Extra time. If the score remains even after the Extra time the two team goes to penalty shootout.

Matches took place on 3 and 4 August 2016.

Final

The final took place on 8 August 2016 at Borg El Arab Stadium in Alexandria. Zamalek were the "home" team (for administrative purposes), as they played the first semi-final match.

Top goalscorers
The following are the top scorers of the Egypt Cup, sorted first by number of goals, and then alphabetically if necessary. Goals scored in penalty shoot-outs are not included.

Notes

References

1
Egypt Cup
2015–16 in Egyptian football